Wee Kirk o' the Heather may refer to:

 Wee Kirk o' the Heather (Forest Lawn Memorial Park, Glendale)
 Wee Kirk o' the Heather (Las Vegas)